Joseph Henry Kelly (September 23, 1886 – August 16, 1977) was an American professional baseball player. He played all or part of five seasons in Major League Baseball between 1914 and 1919 for the Pittsburgh Pirates, Chicago Cubs, and Boston Braves, primarily as an  outfielder.

Kelly had an extensive career in minor league baseball, spanning 23 seasons. He began playing professionally in 1908 with the Tulsa Oilers, and played until 1930, which he spent with the Oklahoma City Indians. He spent the last five years of his career as a player-manager.

References

External links

Major League Baseball outfielders
Pittsburgh Pirates players
Chicago Cubs players
Boston Braves players
Tulsa Oilers (baseball) players
Pittsburg Pirates players
Joplin Miners players
St. Joseph Drummers players
Indianapolis Indians players
Toledo Mud Hens players
San Francisco Seals (baseball) players
Omaha Buffaloes players
Vernon Tigers players
St. Joseph Saints players
Amarillo Texans players
Columbia Comers players
Oklahoma City Indians players
Minor league baseball managers
Baseball players from Kansas
1886 births
1977 deaths
Baseball player-managers